The 2023 Texas Tennis Classic was a professional tennis tournament played on hard courts. It was the first edition of the tournament which was part of the 2023 ATP Challenger Tour. It took place in Waco, Texas, United States between 27 February and 5 March 2023.

Singles main-draw entrants

Seeds

 1 Rankings are as of 20 February 2023.

Other entrants
The following players received wildcards into the singles main draw:
  Ryan Harrison
  Toby Kodat
  Aleksandar Kovacevic

The following players received entry into the singles main draw as special exempts:
  Borna Gojo
  Alex Michelsen

The following player received entry into the singles main draw using a protected ranking:
  Alex Bolt

The following players received entry from the qualifying draw:
  Ulises Blanch
  Aziz Dougaz
  Filip Misolic
  Shintaro Mochizuki
  Keegan Smith
  Coleman Wong

The following player received entry as a lucky loser:
  Elmar Ejupovic

Champions

Singles

 Aleksandar Kovacevic def.  Alexandre Müller 6–3, 4–6, 6–2.

Doubles

  Ivan Sabanov /  Matej Sabanov def.  Evan King /  Mitchell Krueger 6–1, 3–6, [12–10].

References

Texas Tennis Classic
2023 in American tennis
2023 in sports in Texas
February 2023 sports events in the United States
March 2023 sports events in the United States